Bulgunnia Station is a  sheep station in north-western South Australia.

Description
It carries 26,000 merinos and is operated with a staff of seven people. It is one of four adjoining properties operated by the Jumbuck Pastoral Company in the region.
In 2011 the area experienced heavy flooding with the managers, Shane and Cheryl Miller, having to grade a new road to access groceries after becoming isolated for a few days.

The land occupying the extent of the Bulgunnia Station pastoral lease was gazetted as a locality in April 2013 under the name 'Mount Eba'.

Birds
Bulgunnia has been classified by BirdLife International as an Important Bird Area because it is a stronghold for the restricted-range and near-threatened chestnut-breasted whiteface as well as supporting the biome-restricted inland dotterel, Bourke's parrot, chiming wedgebill, cinnamon quail-thrush, pied honeyeater and thick-billed grasswren.

See also
List of ranches and stations

References

Notes

Sources
 
 

Stations (Australian agriculture)
Far North (South Australia)
Pastoral leases in South Australia